Molla Sara (also Romanized as Mollā Sarā) is a village in Molla Sara Rural District, in the Central District of Shaft County, Gilan Province, Iran. At the 2006 census, its population was 1,403, in 372 families.

References 

Populated places in Shaft County